Changureh (also Romanized as Changūreh, Changoreh, Changurah, and Changurakh) is a village in Qaqazan-e Gharbi Rural District, in the Central District of Takestan County, Qazvin Province, Iran. At the 2006 census, its population was 94, in 24 families.

References 

Populated places in Takestan County